Joseph H. Conlin (February 12, 1928 – March 5, 2007) was an American impresario and opera director. Born in Chicago, Conlin founded Conlin Associates, a New York based talent management agency which presented many important European artists via United States tours, including Beniamino Gigli, Jussi Björling, and Renata Tebaldi. He also served as the General Director of the Palm Beach Opera during the 1980s. At the time of his death in West Palm Beach, Florida he was president of the Musicians' Club of New York and was still active as a concert presenter.

References

1928 births
2007 deaths
Impresarios
American opera directors
People from Chicago